Honeybee Robotics Spacecraft Mechanisms Corporation is a small spacecraft technology and robotics company  headquartered in Brooklyn, New York, with offices in Altadena, California and Longmont, Colorado. It was established in 1983 by Stephen Gorevan  and Chris Chapman. In June 2017, Honeybee Robotics was acquired by Ensign-Bickford Industries. In January 2022, Honeybee was sold to Blue Origin.

Products 
Honeybee has particular expertise in developing and operating small mechanical tools used on Mars missions.  Some of the robotic devices it has developed and successfully demonstrated on Mars include:

 The Rock Abrasion Tool (RAT) instruments used on both Mars Exploration Rovers
 The Icy Soil Acquisition Device (ISAD), sometimes called the "Phoenix Scoop", a soil scoop and a precision ice-sampling tool successfully demonstrated on the 2008 Mars Phoenix Lander mission
 The Sample Manipulation System and Dust Removal Tool used on the Mars Science Laboratory mission, which landed in August 2012

In addition, they were developing tools that would be used to live and work on the moon as part of NASA's Constellation program. They are now helping design instruments for NASA's VIPER rover.

Honeybee develops systems for future missions to Mars, Venus, the Moon, two Jovian moons, and asteroid  and comet sample return, among others. They worked with Bigelow Aerospace to develop a preliminary design for a solar array deployment mechanism that was used on the solar arrays of their Genesis inflatable space habitat. Terrestrial projects include developing mechanisms, installations, and systems for a broad array of clients including Con Edison, the U.S. Navy, Coca-Cola, Nike, and architects Diller Scofidio + Renfro. 

In December, 2022, NASA awarded Honeybee Robotics a contract to provide several systems for the upcoming Mars Sample Return mission. These include the Capture, Containment, and Retrieval System (CCRS), Earth Entry System (EES), and Spin Eject Mechanism (SEM).

References

External links 
 
 Mars robot PDF
 NASA

Aerospace companies of the United States
Robotics companies of the United States
Technology companies established in 1983
Companies based in Brooklyn